Abdelkrim Al Khatib (2 March 1921 – 28 September 2008) was a Moroccan surgeon, politician and activist. He co-founded the National Popular Movement which would later split and was eventually re-branded as the Justice and Development Party. He became the first leader of Morocco's House of Representatives.

Biography
Al Khatib was born on 2 March 1921 in El Jadida. His father, Omar Al Khatib, was an administrative interpreter of Algerian origin and his mother Meriem El Guebbas was Moroccan. He became the first surgeon in Morocco and was involved when the Popular Movement was started. He was a campaigner for independence and he became the first leader of Morocco's House of Representatives. He was also a Government minister several times.

After the 1965 period of emergency when the Moroccan King took on the temporary management of Morocco, he founded the Justice and Development Party which emerged from the  Popular Democratic Constitutional Movement in 1988. These were Islamic parties that support the monarchy. It is said that this new party was based on the Turkish party of the same name. But that's not true because the party in Turkey was founded in 2001. But it said that the Turkish Islamic politician Necmettin Erbakan was a big actor by founding the party.

The party was successful in the 2002 election taking 42 out of the 325 seats.

Al Khatib died in Rabat in 2008.

Family

El Khatib is the maternal uncle of Moroccan General Housni Benslimane whose sister is the mother of Ismail Alaoui the ex-president of the Party of Progress and Socialism. El Khatib is also the maternal uncle of Saad Hassar, former secretary of state in the Moroccan Interior Ministry

See also
Justice and Development Party
Mahjoubi Aherdane

References

1921 births
2008 deaths
People from El Jadida
Presidents of the House of Representatives (Morocco)
Moroccan surgeons
Popular Movement (Morocco) politicians
Justice and Development Party (Morocco) politicians
Members of the Moroccan Army of Liberation
Moroccan people of Algerian descent
20th-century surgeons